Malek Rud (also Romanized as Malek Rūd; also known as Malek Rūd-e Pā’īn and Malek Rūd-e Vasaţ) is a village in Khara Rud Rural District, in the Central District of Siahkal County, Gilan Province, Iran. At the 2006 census, its population was 596, in 140 families.

References 

Populated places in Siahkal County